Mohammed Faeez Khan is a South African soccer player who currently plays for Cambodian Premier League club Visakha.

References

1992 births
People from the Eastern Cape
South African soccer players
Living people
Association football midfielders